St. Joseph College of Education is a teacher education college in Tamil Nadu, India.  It is approved by the National Council for Teacher Education (NCTE), Bangalore, and is affiliated with the Tamil Nadu Teachers Education University, Chennai.

About the College
St. Joseph College of Education is on the Kalakad – Nanguneri Road, Tirunelveli District, and is run by 'The Women and Child Development Society'.

Motto
'Terras Irradient', a Latin phrase, which means 'Let them give light to the world'.

Courses Offered
The college offers BEd degree programme in full-time basis. The course of study shall be for a duration of one academic year consisting of 200 working days / curriculum transaction days or 1200 hours (6days per week @ 6 hour per day) excluding admission and examination days. The 200 working days will include teaching practice, revision examination and study holidays.

Programme Content and Details

The programme content will be as per the Tamil Nadu Teachers Education University. The programme will consist of theory and practicum component.

Subjects offered

 Tamil Education
 English Education
 Mathematics Education
 Physical Science Education
 Biological Science Education
 History Education
 Commerce Education
 Economics Education
 Computer Science Education

Electives offered

 Guidance and Counselling
 Environmental Education
 Physical and Health Education
 Computers in Education

Coat of arms
The emblem consists of a shield with a ribbon. The shield is divided into four sectors, which depicts the four major dimensions of education namely intellectual, emotional, physical and spiritual. In the centre, the four sectors are separated by a cross which depicts the four directions namely North, South, East and West.

A candle on the top of the right side stands for knowledge. It eliminates ignorance (darkness) and bestows wisdom (brightness). A computer on the bottom of the right side symbolizes science and technology. At the bottom of the left side a man bearing a book stands for education and training. A cross on the left top symbolizes sanctity, prosperity and godliness. Rays from the cross blesses and purifies all the things. Around the shield, the name of the college and place with pin code is imprinted in a circle.

Administration
Mr. A. Tamilselvan s/o Arasamuthu Nadar is the chairman and Mrs. M. Vijaya Gnanapoo is the correspondent of this college. Dr.A.S.Arul Lawrence was the Principal from 15 July 2010 to 26 February 2014. Now, Dr.J.Albert Prince Kumar is the principal of the college since 1 March 2014.

References

External links
 St. Joseph College of Education

Colleges of education in Tamil Nadu
Education in Tirunelveli district
Educational institutions established in 2007
2007 establishments in Tamil Nadu